Mount Strachan is located on the border of Alberta and British Columbia on the Continental Divide. It was named in 1918 after Strachan, Lt. Henry VC.

See also
 List of peaks on the Alberta–British Columbia border
 Mountains of Alberta
 Mountains of British Columbia

References

Strachan
Strachan
Strachan
Canadian Rockies